Miodrag Radulović (born 23 October 1967) is a Montenegrin professional football manager and former player who is the manager of the Montenegro national team.

Club career
Born in Titograd, Montenegro, his football career began in 1980 at Budućnost Titograd. He went on to play for Sutjeska Nikšić in the Yugoslav Second League in the first half of the 1988–89 season, and then moved to Budućnost Titograd during winter break and played with them in the Yugoslav First League till 1991. Then he played with Hajduk Kula, Zemun, Pierikos and Degerfors IF.

Managerial career

Early career
He started his managerial career as an assistant to Nikola Rakojević at Zeta and Borac Banja Luka, and was an assistant to Željko Petrović at Portuguese side Boavista in 2006.

He also assisted Vladimir Petrović with the Serbia and Montenegro U21 team that qualified for the Olympic Games in Athens 2004. He then managed the Serbia and Montenegro U19 team from 2005 to 2006. He was also coach and scout for Montenegro national football team.

He managed Uzbek League team FC Pakhtakor Tashkent from January to April 2010, finishing second in the league and qualifying for the Round of 16 of the 2010 AFC Champions League. On 3 May, almost a week before Pakhtakor's round of 16 clash with Al-Gharafa, he resigned, citing family reasons and that he was invited to work at a "European club with rich history and big ambitions by a close friend." That club turned out to be FC Dynamo Moscow.
He was an assistant at Dynamo Moscow from April 2010 to April 2011.

In 2011, Radulović signed for Montenegrin First League club Budućnost Podgorica. He won the league in the 2011–2012 season with the most wins and the record number of points and goals in the league.

In June 2012, Radulović signed for Kuwaiti Premier League club Kazma.

Lebanon

He was appointed as new coach of Lebanon in 2015, following the departure of Italian manager Giuseppe Giannini. While he failed to qualify Lebanon to the 2018 FIFA World Cup, he successfully led them to their first ever AFC Asian Cup through qualification in 2019. Thus, he registered as the first Montenegrin to help a team qualify to a major tournament.

On 9 January 2019, Radulović coached Lebanon's first group stage game in the 2019 AFC Asian Cup against Qatar, losing 2–0. After the match, Radulović fell into a disagreement with Bassel Jradi and subsequently ruled him out of the national team for the rest of the tournament. In the second match, he lost once again against Saudi Arabia by the same score; he was fined between $5,000 and $7,000 by the AFC for protesting during the game. In the final game of the group stage Radulović led Lebanon to their 4–1 win against North Korea, their first in the competition's history. However, the three points weren't enough as Lebanon were knocked out of the competition, losing out to Vietnam in the third-place ranking on the fairplay rule.

Radulović was also the supervisor for the Lebanon national under-23 team during the 2020 AFC U-23 Championship qualification. On 26 March 2019, the LFA announced that they would not renew his contract terminating on 1 May 2019 and that they would be looking to replace him with another foreign manager.

Myanmar
On 20 April 2019, Radulović was appointed by the Myanmar Football Federation (MFF) as new head coach for the Myanmar national team. According to the official announcement, the MFF gave Radulović and his assistant coach a contract valid until December 2020. The position as head coach of Myanmar had been vacant for four months, after the MFF parted ways with their former head coach Antoine Hey.

However, he was sacked in October 2019, only six months after being appointed. Radulović's debut versus Singapore was a success winning 1–2. Under Radulović, Myanmar's performance in the 2022 World Cup qualification wasn't as good as he expected from debut, with away losses to Mongolia and to Kyrgyzstan.

Zob Ahan
On 14 January 2020, Radulović was named coach of Iranian club Zob Ahan, signing a one-and-a-half-year deal. He would be reunited with goalkeeper Mehdi Khalil, who he coached as manager of the Lebanon national team. Radulović left Isfahan following the COVID-19 pandemic, and didn't return to Iran;  he was replaced by Croatian coach Luka Bonačić.

Montenegro 
On 28 December 2020, Radulović was appointed head coach of the Montenegro national team ahead of the 2022 FIFA World Cup qualifiers.

Career statistics

Managerial

Honours

Manager
Budućnost Podgorica
Montenegrin First League: 2011–12

References

External links

 
 
 

1967 births
Living people
Footballers from Podgorica
Association football midfielders
Yugoslav footballers
Serbia and Montenegro footballers
FK Sutjeska Nikšić players
FK Budućnost Podgorica players
FK Hajduk Kula players
FK Zemun players
degerfors IF players
Pierikos F.C. players
Yugoslav First League players
First League of Serbia and Montenegro players
Serbia and Montenegro expatriate footballers
Expatriate footballers in Greece
Serbia and Montenegro expatriate sportspeople in Greece
Montenegrin football managers
Pakhtakor Tashkent FK managers
FK Budućnost Podgorica managers
Kazma SC managers
FC Atyrau managers
Al Jahra SC managers
Lebanon national football team managers
Myanmar national football team managers
Zob Ahan Esfahan F.C. managers
Montenegro national football team managers
Montenegrin expatriate football managers
Expatriate football managers in Uzbekistan
Montenegrin expatriate sportspeople in Uzbekistan
Expatriate football managers in Kuwait
Montenegrin expatriate sportspeople in Kuwait
Expatriate football managers in Kazakhstan
Montenegrin expatriate sportspeople in Kazakhstan
Expatriate football managers in Lebanon
Montenegrin expatriate sportspeople in Lebanon
Expatriate football managers in Myanmar
Expatriate football managers in Iran
Montenegrin expatriate sportspeople in Iran
2019 AFC Asian Cup managers
Kuwait Premier League managers
Persian Gulf Pro League managers